Terzigno is a comune (municipality) in the Metropolitan City of Naples in the Italian region Campania, located about 20 km east of Naples. As of 31 December 2004, it had a population of 16,977 and an area of 23.5 km2.

The municipality of Terzigno contains the frazione (subdivision) Boccia al Mauro.

Terzigno borders the following municipalities: Boscoreale, Boscotrecase, Ottaviano, Poggiomarino, San Giuseppe Vesuviano.

History

In Roman times Terzigno was an rural outlying suburb of Pompeii in which numerous aristocratic and rustic country villas were located and which were all buried and preserved beneath many metres of volcanic debris by the eruption of Mount Vesuvius in 79 AD.

Excavations at Terzigno began in 1983 with the unearthing of three villas and work has continued sporadically since.
Exquisite frescoes and were found and silver and gold objects including jewellery on five skeletons of people who failed to escape the eruption.

Demographic evolution

References

Cities and towns in Campania